Derek Heidt (born 8 September 1975) is a Canadian snowboarder. He competed in the men's halfpipe event at the 1998 Winter Olympics.

References

1975 births
Living people
Canadian male snowboarders
Olympic snowboarders of Canada
Snowboarders at the 1998 Winter Olympics
Sportspeople from Calgary